Stuart John Francis Cosgrove (born 12 November 1952) is a Scottish journalist, broadcaster and television executive. As a journalist Cosgrove served on the NME (Media Editor) and The Face during the 1980s, before joining Channel 4 in 1994, serving for eight years as Controller of Arts and Entertainment and then as Head of Programmes (Nations and Regions) until stepping down in 2015.

Education
Cosgrove graduated in Drama and English from the University of Hull and has studied at George Mason University, Harvard’s John F. Kennedy School of Government and Wharton Business School. He has a Ph.D. in Media (the thesis published as part of the book Theatres of the Left, 1880-1935) and a Doctorate in English and American Studies. He has been awarded an honorary Doctor of Arts by the University of Abertay Dundee and honorary professorships by the University of Stirling and Liverpool John Moores University.

Career
Cosgrove is the co-host of BBC Radio Scotland's popular comedy football phone-in Off the Ball which he presents twice a week with Tam Cowan, and as the co-host of BBC Scotland's Saturday football Sportscene results show. Born and brought up in the Letham area of Perth, but living now in Dennistoun, he is an avid fan of the city's football club [St Johnstone]. He also wrote a book, Hampden Babylon, revealing the seedier side of the Scottish football scene.

In 2005 he was named Broadcaster of the Year at the Glenfiddich Spirit of Scotland Awards.

In 2007 and 2008, he presented Stuart Cosgrove's Floorfillers on BBC Radio Scotland, dedicated to Northern Soul music, of which he is a fan.

His "Haha, Fantastic, ye cannae beat it" quote is used by satirist and impressionist Jonathan Watson.

Personal life
Cosgrove's father, a Perth native, was killed in his early 30s in a road accident in 1960, when Cosgrove was eight years old. A lorry driver for the Co-op supermarket, one of the tyres of the lorry he was travelling in as a passenger blew and the lorry hit a tree. His mother lived until she was 90.

In August 1963, Cosgrove and his family were stuck on a train near Carlisle railway station for six hours. It transpired that all of the trains on the Glasgow line were stopped because the Great Train Robbery had just occurred in Ledburn, England.

Cosgrove began supporting his hometown club St Johnstone because, before the Tulloch estate to the northeast came to be, he could see their then-ground Muirton Park from his Letham bedroom window. For the first three or four years of his life, the family lived in Hillyland before the short move to Strathtay Road in Letham when he was about seven years of age.

Cosgrove is married to Shirani, a TV executive of Sri Lankan Tamil heritage. They have a son, Jack. Cosgrove also has a daughter from his previous marriage (1992–1999) to Angie, a beautician.

His two sisters are Alison and Marilyn.

Bibliography
Theatres of the Left, 1880-1935, Workers' Theatre Movements in Britain and America, by Raphael Samuel, Ewan MacColl and Stuart Cosgrove, 1985. 
Flogging a Dead Horse: Heritage Culture and Its Role in Post-industrial Britain, Manchester: Cornerhouse, 1993. . With photographs by Paul Reas and an afterword by Val Williams.
Detroit 67: The Year That Changed Soul, Polygon, 2016
Young Soul Rebels: A Personal History of Northern Soul, Polygon, 2017
Memphis 68: The Tragedy of Southern Soul Polygon, 2018
Harlem 69: The Future of Soul, Polygon, 2018
Cassius X: A Legend in the Making, Birlinn General, 2020
Hey America!: The Epic Story of Black Music and the White House, Birlinn General, 2020

References

1952 births
Living people
Alumni of the University of Hull
BBC Scotland newsreaders and journalists
Harvard Kennedy School alumni
Writers from Perth, Scotland
Scottish radio personalities
Scottish sportswriters
Scottish television presenters